House Music is the debut solo album from Steven James Adams, formerly of Broken Family Band and Singing Adams. It was released by London label The state51 Conspiracy in September 2014.

The album features appearances and contributions from Dan Mangan, Justin Young from The Vaccines, Martin Green from Lau and Emily Barker.

Track listing

References

2014 debut albums